Thomas Young FRS (13 June 177310 May 1829) was a British polymath who made notable contributions to the fields of vision, light, solid mechanics, energy, physiology, language, musical harmony, and Egyptology. He was instrumental in the decipherment of Egyptian hieroglyphs, specifically the Rosetta Stone.

Young has been described as "The Last Man Who Knew Everything". His work influenced that of William Herschel, Hermann von Helmholtz, James Clerk Maxwell, and Albert Einstein. Young is credited with establishing the wave theory of light, in contrast to the particle theory of Isaac Newton. Young's work was subsequently supported by the work of Augustin-Jean Fresnel.

Personal life
Young belonged to a Quaker family of Milverton, Somerset, where he was born in 1773, the eldest of ten children. By the age of fourteen, Young had learned Greek, Latin, French, Italian, Syriac, Samaritan Hebrew, Arabic, Biblical Aramaic, Persian, Turkish, and Ge'ez.

Young began to study medicine in London at St Bartholomew's Hospital in 1792, moved to the University of Edinburgh Medical School in 1794, and a year later went to Göttingen, Lower Saxony, Germany, where he obtained the degree of doctor of medicine in 1796 from the University of Göttingen. In 1797 he entered Emmanuel College, Cambridge. In the same year he inherited the estate of his grand-uncle, Richard Brocklesby, which made him financially independent, and in 1799 he established himself as a physician at 48 Welbeck Street, London (now recorded with a blue plaque). Young published many of his first academic articles anonymously to protect his reputation as a physician.

In 1801, Young was appointed professor of natural philosophy (mainly physics) at the Royal Institution. In two years, he delivered 91 lectures. In 1802, he was appointed foreign secretary of the Royal Society, of which he had been elected a fellow in 1794. He resigned his professorship in 1803, fearing that its duties would interfere with his medical practice. His lectures were published in 1807 in the Course of Lectures on Natural Philosophy and contain a number of anticipations of later theories.

In 1811, Young became physician to St George's Hospital, and in 1814 he served on a committee appointed to consider the dangers involved in the general introduction of gas for lighting into London. In 1816 he was secretary of a commission charged with ascertaining the precise length of the seconds pendulum (the length of a pendulum whose period is exactly 2 seconds), and in 1818 he became secretary to the Board of Longitude and superintendent of the HM Nautical Almanac Office.

Young was elected a Foreign Honorary Member of the American Academy of Arts and Sciences in 1822. A few years before his death he became interested in life insurance, and in 1827 he was chosen one of the eight foreign associates of the French Academy of Sciences. In the same year he became a first class corresponding member, living abroad, of the Royal Institute of the Netherlands. In 1828, he was elected a foreign member of the Royal Swedish Academy of Sciences.

In 1804, Young married Eliza Maxwell. They had no children.

Young died in his 56th year in London on 10 May 1829, having suffered recurrent attacks of "asthma". His autopsy revealed atherosclerosis of the aorta. His body was buried in the graveyard of St. Giles Church at Farnborough, in the county of Kent. Westminster Abbey houses a white marble tablet in memory of Young, bearing an epitaph by Hudson Gurney:

Young was highly regarded by his friends and colleagues. He was said never to impose his knowledge, but if asked was able to answer even the most difficult scientific question with ease. Although very learned he had a reputation for sometimes having difficulty in communicating his knowledge. It was said by one of his contemporaries that, "His words were not those in familiar use, and the arrangement of his ideas seldom the same as those he conversed with. He was therefore worse calculated than any man I ever knew for the communication of knowledge."

Religious views 
Though he sometimes dealt with religious topics of history in Egypt and wrote about the history of Christianity in Nubia, not much is known about Young's personal religious views. On George Peacock's account, Young never spoke to him about morals, metaphysics or religion, though according to Young's wife, his attitudes showed that "his Quaker upbringing had strongly influenced his religious practices." Authoritative sources have described Young in terms of a cultural Christian Quaker.

Hudson Gurney informed that before his marriage, Young had to join the Church of England, and was baptized later. After his work on physics received some criticism from Henry Brougham, Young stated: "I have resolved to confine my studies and my pen to medical subjects only. For the talents which God has not given me, I am not responsible, but those which I possess, I have hitherto cultivated and employed as diligently as my opportunities have allowed me to do; and I shall continue to apply them with assiduity, and in tranquillity, to that profession which has constantly been the ultimate object of all my labours.

Gurney stated that Young "retained a good deal of his old creed, and carried to his scriptural studies his habit of inquisition of languages and manners," rather than the habit of proselytism. Yet, the day before his death, Young participated in religious sacraments; as reported in David Brewster's Edinburgh Journal of Science: "After some information concerning his affairs, and some instructions concerning the hierographical papers in his hands, he said that, perfectly aware of his situation, he had taken the sacraments of the church on the day preceding. His religious sentiments were by himself stated to be liberal, though orthodox. He had extensively studied the Scriptures, of which the precepts were deeply impressed upon his mind from his earliest years; and he evidenced the faith which he professed; in an unbending course of usefulness and rectitude."

Research

Wave theory of light

In Young's own judgment, of his many achievements the most important was to establish the wave theory of light. To do so, he had to overcome the century-old view, expressed in the venerable Newton's Opticks, that light is a particle. Nevertheless, in the early 19th century Young put forth a number of theoretical reasons supporting the wave theory of light, and he developed two enduring demonstrations to support this viewpoint. With the ripple tank he demonstrated the idea of interference in the context of water waves. With Young's interference experiment, the predecessor of the double-slit experiment, he demonstrated interference in the context of light as a wave.

Young, speaking on 24 November 1803, to the Royal Society of London, began his now-classic description of the historic experiment:

He observed that placing another card in front or behind the narrow strip so as to prevent the light beam from striking one of its edges caused the fringes to disappear. This supported the contention that light is composed of waves.

Young performed and analysed a number of experiments, including interference of light from reflection off nearby pairs of micrometre grooves, from reflection off thin films of soap and oil, and from Newton's rings. He also performed two important diffraction experiments using fibres and long narrow strips. In his Course of Lectures on Natural Philosophy and the Mechanical Arts (1807) he gives Grimaldi credit for first observing the fringes in the shadow of an object placed in a beam of light. Within ten years, much of Young's work was reproduced and then extended by Augustin-Jean Fresnel.

Young's modulus

Young described the characterization of elasticity that came to be known as Young's modulus, denoted as E, in 1807, and further described it in his Course of Lectures on Natural Philosophy and the Mechanical Arts.
However, the first use of the concept of Young's modulus in experiments was by Giordano Riccati in 1782—predating Young by 25 years.
Furthermore, the idea can be traced to a paper by Leonhard Euler published in 1727, some 80 years before Thomas Young's 1807 paper.

The Young's modulus relates the stress (pressure) in a body to its associated strain (change in length as a ratio of the original length); that is, stress = E × strain, for a uniaxially loaded specimen. Young's modulus is independent of the component under investigation; that is, it is an inherent material property (the term modulus refers to an inherent material property). Young's Modulus allowed, for the first time, prediction of the strain in a component subject to a known stress (and vice versa). Prior to Young's contribution, engineers were required to apply Hooke's F = kx relationship to identify the deformation (x) of a body subject to a known load (F), where the constant (k) is a function of both the geometry and material under consideration. Finding k required physical testing for any new component, as the F = kx relationship is a function of both geometry and material.  Young's Modulus depends only on the material, not its geometry, thus allowing a revolution in engineering strategies.

Young's problems in sometimes not expressing himself clearly were shown by his own definition of the modulus: "The modulus of the elasticity of any substance is a column of the same substance, capable of producing a pressure on its base which is to the weight causing a certain degree of compression as the length of the substance is to the diminution of its length." When this explanation was put to the Lords of the Admiralty, their clerk wrote to Young saying "Though science is much respected by their Lordships and your paper is much esteemed, it is too learned ... in short it is not understood."

Vision and colour theory
Young has also been called the founder of physiological optics. In 1793 he explained the mode in which the eye accommodates itself to vision at different distances as depending on change of the curvature of the crystalline lens; in 1801 he was the first to describe astigmatism; and in his lectures he presented the hypothesis, afterwards developed by Hermann von Helmholtz, (the Young–Helmholtz theory), that colour perception depends on the presence in the retina of three kinds of nerve fibres. This foreshadowed the modern understanding of colour vision, in particular the finding that the eye does indeed have three colour receptors which are sensitive to different wavelength ranges.

Young–Laplace equation
In 1804, Young developed the theory of capillary phenomena on the principle of surface tension. He also observed the constancy of the angle of contact of a liquid surface with a solid, and showed how from these two principles to deduce the phenomena of capillary action. In 1805, Pierre-Simon Laplace, the French philosopher, discovered the significance of meniscus radii with respect to capillary action.

In 1830, Carl Friedrich Gauss, the German mathematician, unified the work of these two scientists to derive the Young–Laplace equation, the formula that describes the capillary pressure difference sustained across the interface between two static fluids.

Young was the first to define the term "energy" in the modern sense.  He also did work on the theory of tides paralleling that of Laplace and anticipating more well-known work by Airy.

Young's equation and Young–Dupré equation

Young's equation describes the contact angle of a liquid drop on a plane solid surface as a function of the surface free energy, the interfacial free energy and the surface tension of the liquid. Young's equation was developed further some 60 years later by Dupré to account for thermodynamic effects, and this is known as the Young–Dupré equation.

Medicine
In physiology Young made an important contribution to haemodynamics in the Croonian lecture for 1808 on the "Functions of the Heart and Arteries," where he derived a formula for the wave speed of the pulse and his medical writings included An Introduction to Medical Literature, including a System of Practical Nosology (1813) and A Practical and Historical Treatise on Consumptive Diseases (1815).

Young devised a rule of thumb for determining a child's drug dosage. Young's Rule states that the child dosage is equal to the adult dosage multiplied by the child's age in years, divided by the sum of 12 plus the child's age.

Languages
In an appendix to his 1796 Göttingen dissertation De corporis hvmani viribvs conservatricibvs there are four pages added proposing a universal phonetic alphabet (so as 'not to leave these pages blank'; lit.: "Ne vacuae starent hae paginae, libuit e praelectione ante disputationem habenda tabellam literarum vniuersalem raptim describere"). It includes 16 "pure" vowel symbols, nasal vowels, various consonants, and examples of these, drawn primarily from French and English.

In his Encyclopædia Britannica article "Languages", Young compared the grammar and vocabulary of 400 languages. In a separate work in 1813, he introduced the term Indo-European languages, 165 years after the Dutch linguist and scholar Marcus Zuerius van Boxhorn proposed the grouping to which this term refers in 1647.

Egyptian hieroglyphs

Young made significant contributions to the decipherment of ancient Egyptian writing systems. He started his Egyptology work rather late, in 1813, when the work was already in progress among other researchers.

He began by using an Egyptian demotic alphabet of 29 letters built up by Johan David Åkerblad in 1802 (14 turned out to be incorrect). Åkerblad was correct in stressing the importance of the demotic text in trying to read the inscriptions, but he wrongly believed that demotic was entirely alphabetic.

By 1814 Young had completely translated the "enchorial" text of the Rosetta Stone (using a list with 86 demotic words), and then studied the hieroglyphic alphabet but initially failed to recognise that the demotic and hieroglyphic texts were paraphrases and not simple translations.

There was considerable rivalry between Young and Jean-François Champollion while both were working on hieroglyphic decipherment. At first they briefly cooperated in their work, but later, from around 1815, a chill arose between them. For many years they kept details of their work away from each other.

Some of Young's conclusions appeared in the famous article "Egypt" he wrote for the 1818 edition of the Encyclopædia Britannica.

When Champollion finally published a translation of the hieroglyphs and the key to the grammatical system in 1822, Young (and many others) praised his work. Nevertheless, a year later Young published an Account of the Recent Discoveries in Hieroglyphic Literature and Egyptian Antiquities, with the aim of having his own work recognised as the basis for Champollion's system.

Young had correctly found the sound value of six hieroglyphic signs, but had not deduced the grammar of the language. Young himself acknowledged that he was somewhat at a disadvantage because Champollion's knowledge of the relevant languages, such as Coptic, was much greater.

Several scholars have suggested that Young's true contribution to Egyptology was his decipherment of the demotic script. He made the first major advances in this area; he also correctly identified demotic as being composed by both ideographic and phonetic signs.

Subsequently, Young felt that Champollion was unwilling to share the credit for the decipherment. In the ensuing controversy, strongly motivated by the political tensions of that time, the British tended to champion Young, while the French mostly championed Champollion. Champollion did acknowledge some of Young's contribution, but rather sparingly. However, after 1826, when Champollion was a curator in the Louvre, he did offer Young access to demotic manuscripts.

In England, while Sir George Lewis still doubted Champollion's achievement as late as 1862, others were more accepting. For example, Reginald Poole, and Sir Peter Le Page Renouf both defended Champollion.

Music
Young developed Young temperament, a method of tuning musical instruments.

Legacy
Later scholars and scientists have praised Young's work although they may know him only through achievements he made in their fields. His contemporary Sir John Herschel called him a "truly original genius". Albert Einstein praised him in the 1931 foreword to an edition of Isaac Newton's Opticks. Other admirers include physicist Lord Rayleigh and Nobel Physics laureate Philip Anderson.

Thomas Young's name has been adopted as the name of the London-based Thomas Young Centre, an alliance of academic research groups engaged in the theory and simulation of materials.

Young Sound in eastern Greenland was named in his honour by William Scoresby (1789–1857).

Selected writings
 A Course of Lectures on Natural Philosophy and the Mechanical Arts (1807, republished 2002 by Thoemmes Press).
 Miscellaneous Works of the Late Thomas Young, M.D., F.R.S. (1855, 3 volumes, editor John Murray, republished 2003 by Thoemmes Press).

See also
Coandă effect
Color space
History of energy
Refractive index
Ultrahydrophobicity

References

Works cited

Further reading

 - The link is to a pdf version of the paper.
 
 
 
 Reviewed by Nicholas Shakespeare in The Telegraph, 24 September 2006.
 Reviewed  by Michael Bywater in The New Statesman, 13 November 2006.
 Reviewed by Simon Singh in The Telegraph, 26 November 2006.
 Reviewed by Rosemary Hill in The Times, 10 December 2006.
 Reviewed by PD Smith in The Guardian, 20 January 2007.
 - Discusses Young's theoretical and experimental work on interference
 
 Young's account of his hieroglyphic research. (reissued by Cambridge University Press, 2010. )

External links 

Thomas young the founder of  wave theory
 
 
 

19th-century archaeologists
19th-century English writers
1773 births
1829 deaths
Acousticians
Alumni of Emmanuel College, Cambridge
Alumni of the University of Edinburgh Medical School
Color scientists
English Egyptologists
English physicists
English physiologists
English Quakers
Fellows of the American Academy of Arts and Sciences
Fellows of the Royal Society
Members of the Royal Netherlands Academy of Arts and Sciences
Members of the Royal Swedish Academy of Sciences
Optical physicists
People from Milverton, Somerset
Systems thinking
University of Göttingen alumni